Kosal Kranti Dal (KKD) is a regional political outfit of Odisha with particular focus on western Odisha which is known for its separatist movement for a separate Koshal state as per article 2 & 3 of Indian Constitution. KKD is mainly focusing on the creation of a separate Kosal state by the bifurcation of Odisha.The KKD was formed in the year 2007 with veteran Koshalbadi leader and potential advocate  Pramod Mishra became its first president. Later on Bunde Dharua of Jharsuguda became the president. Now KKD central office is located at Jharsuguda and Narayana Mohapatra is the president.

History
As reported by various news agencies KKD was floated in Odisha in 2007. The Party secretary Mr. Baidyanath Mishra said that KKD had been recognized by the Election Commission. Since 2007 it is fighting assembly and lok sabha elections. Mishara announced that "the party would fight for a separate state comprising ten districts of western Odisha and Athmallik sub-division of Angul district as he alleged that the area remained neglected by successive governments during the past 60 years."

As of 2013, it is quite active conducting strikes in the proposed 10 Western Odisha districts, which is widely being supported by the local public. It has intensified its demand in the wake of Telangana being granted statehood.

Main demands
 Separate Kosal state comprising Western Odisha districts and Athmallik subdivision.
 Recognition of Kosli language and culture.
 Development of Western Odisha with regards to education, agriculture, infrastructure and health services.
 Recognition of history of Kosal.
 Demand for second State reorganisation panel.

See also
 Kosal state movement
 Kosli language movement
 Kosalananda Kavya
 Prem Ram Dubey

References

External links
Kosal Kranti Dal will hold a national seminar on smaller states on July 8 at Sambalpur
Demand of Kosal state
Kosal Kranti Dal observes Utkal Divas as ‘black day’ 
Many stage rally for a separate Kosal state
Cry for Kosal state

State political parties in Odisha
Regionalist parties in India
Political parties established in 2007
2007 establishments in Orissa